Guy B. Johnson (February 28, 1901 – March 23, 1991) was an American sociologist and social anthropologist. He was a distinguished student of black culture in the rural South and a pioneer advocate of racial equality.

Life
Johnson was born in Caddo Mills, Texas. He married Guion Griffis, a noted historian, and together they had two sons: Guy Benton, Jr. and Edward.

Academic career
Johnson graduated with a Bachelor of Arts from Baylor University and the University of Chicago, and an Master of Arts from the University of North Carolina at Chapel Hill (PhD, 1927). After teaching a year each at Ohio Wesleyan University and Baylor College for Women (now Mary-Hardin Baylor), Johnson was recruited to North Carolina as a research assistant in Howard W. Odum's new Institute for Research in Social Science in 1924, which he never left for long. He taught at Chapel Hill from 1927 until he retired as Kenan Professor of Sociology and Anthropology in 1969.

His main writings were on Southern black folk culture and U.S. race relations.  In Folk Culture, he analyzed the Gullah dialect of English spoken by blacks on that isolated South Carolina island and, in sophisticated technical detail, the musical structure of the spirituals they sang to support a new interpretation of black folk culture.

References

External links
Oral History Interviews with Guy B. Johnson ,  from Oral Histories of the American South

American sociologists
Baylor University alumni
University of Chicago alumni
University of North Carolina at Chapel Hill alumni
Ohio Wesleyan University faculty
University of North Carolina at Chapel Hill faculty
1901 births
1991 deaths
People from Hunt County, Texas
Presidents of the Society for the Scientific Study of Religion
Social Forces editors